Pyrgos Dirou is a town in Mani, Laconia, Greece. It is part of the municipal unit of Oitylo.

History
The Battle of Vergas (Greek War of Independence, 1824) took place near Diro.

They form part of an p3ne river. About  of polla have been exposed and are accessible by small boats and through narrow passageways. One is surrounded by formations of stalagmites and stalactites. Archaeological research has shown that the caves served as places of worship in Paleolithic and Neolithic times and their inhabitant believed that the caves were the entrance to the underworld.

Notes

See also
List of settlements in Laconia

External links
Mani tour, most beautiful area of Greece
Panoramic photos of Mani, the area around Diros

Populated places in Laconia
Populated places in the Mani Peninsula
East Mani